The 2012 South American Race Walking Championships were held in Salinas, Ecuador, on March 17–18, 2012.   The track of the championship runs in El Malecón de Salinas.

A detailed report on the event and an appraisal of the results was given by Eduardo Biscayart for the IAAF.

Complete results were published.  The junior events are documented on the World Junior Athletics History webpages.

Medallists

Results

Men's 20km

*: Extra athlete (illegible for team and individual results).

Team 20km Men

Men's 50km

Team 50km Men

Men's 10km Junior (U20)

*: Extra athlete (illegible for team and individual results).

Team 10km Men Junior (U20)

Men's 10km Youth (U18)

*: Extra athlete (illegible for team and individual results).

Team 10km Men Youth (U18)

Women's 20km

*: Extra athlete (illegible for team and individual results).

Team 20km Women

Women's 10km Junior (U20)

*: Extra athlete (illegible for team and individual results).

Team 10km Women Junior (U20)

Women's 5km Youth (U18)

*: Extra athlete (illegible for team and individual results).

Team 5km Women Youth (U18)

Participation
The participation of 87 athletes from 8 countries is reported.

 (7)
 (8)
 (16)
 (5)
 (14)
 (27)
 (2)
 (8)

See also
 2012 Race Walking Year Ranking

References

South American Race Walking Championships
South American Race Walking Championships
International athletics competitions hosted by Ecuador
South American Race Walking Championships
March 2012 sports events in South America